Skin is the second studio album by Australian electronic musician Flume. It was released on 27 May 2016 by Future Classic. The album was Flume's second full-length release following his self-titled debut in 2012. It features guest appearances from Kai, Vic Mensa, Kučka, Tove Lo, Vince Staples, Allan Kingdom, Raekwon, Little Dragon, AlunaGeorge, MNDR, and Beck.

Skin received generally positive reviews and debuted at number one on the Australian Albums Chart, also peaking at number eight on the US Billboard 200. The album was named Album of the Year at the 2016 ARIA Music Awards. It also won the Best Dance/Electronic Album at the 2017 Grammy Awards. At the J Awards, the album was nominated for Australian Album of the Year.

Release and promotion
Skin premiered via a Facebook live stream on 26 May 2016, which also included video segments of Phil Taggart interviewing Flume at the album listening party in London. "Never Be like You" featuring Canadian singer Kai, was released as the album's lead single on 15 January 2016. "Smoke & Retribution" featuring American rapper Vince Staples and Australian singer Kučka, was released as the album's second single on 28 January 2016. "Say It" featuring Swedish singer Tove Lo, was released as the album's third single on 20 April 2016.

Critical reception

Skin was met with generally positive reviews. At Metacritic, which assigns a normalised rating out of 100 to reviews from professional publications, the album received an average score of 75, based on 11 reviews. Aggregator AnyDecentMusic? gave it 6.8 out of 10, based on their assessment of the critical consensus.

Heather Phares of AllMusic said, "While it could have benefitted from some editing, Skin still shows a lot of growth--it's more mature, and more memorable, than Flume". Kahron Spearman of The Austin Chronicle said, "Skin goes Technicolor and bigger, effectively standing on the shoulders of Disclosure and giant stars including Skrillex, Diplo, and album collaborator/reinventor Beck". Derek Staples of Consequence said, "Gearing up to be the next EDM crossover talent, Flume's sophomore effort, Skin, showcases a producer at ease with all of the sounds moving tickets at America's major festival events: hip-hop, indie pop, and EDM". The Independents Justin Carissimo gave the album a very positive review, stating that the album was "the audio equivalent of ecstasy". David Smith of the Evening Standard gave a similarly positive review, stating that "this is music that can do much more than get feet moving". Luke Fowler of Pretty Much Amazing said, "Skin is the sound of Flume reaching for great heights and almost grasping what he seeks there".

Stacey Anderson of Pitchfork said, "["Wall Fuck" is] short and snappy, gone too fast in an album that could've been streamlined to let moments like it shine. But maybe it's the sound of floodgates opening". Keith Harris of Rolling Stone said, "Restless versatility is all over the LP, generating the emotional crests and sensory overload a festival crowd demands, but with a nuance that'll make it work even if you aren't shirtless in the desert". Jonathan Wroble of Slant Magazine said, "If the burden on electronic producers is to establish personality beyond a dense network of light displays and computer processing, this album gets Flume halfway there: It shows him as unquestionably human (overeager, alternately flashy and timid, sometimes more in awe than in control), but still a bit faceless". The Sydney Morning Heralds Craig Mathieson gave the album a positive review, stating that "the record is intoxicating and eclectic". Jim Carroll of The Irish Times felt that several tracks seemed to emphasize "showing off textures rather than providing the breathing room for an actual song to emerge". Ben Thompson of The Observer said, "Distinguished guests—UK nearly siren AlunaGeorge, rapper Vince Staples--are ushered respectfully through a series of viable electronic hinterlands, where a couple of them, notably perennial cameo supplier Little Dragon and Wu Tang vet Raekwon, manage to put down roots in actual songs".

Industry awards

Track listing
All tracks produced by Flume.

Notes
 "Say It" features additional vocals by Daniel Johns
 "Pika" features vocals by Wills

Charts

Weekly charts

Year-end charts

Certifications

See also
 List of number-one albums of 2016 (Australia)

References

2016 albums
Flume (musician) albums
Mom + Pop Music albums
Transgressive Records albums
Albums produced by Flume (musician)
ARIA Award-winning albums
Grammy Award for Best Dance/Electronica Album